Natália Szabanin (born 11 October 2003) is a Hungarian tennis player.

Szabanin has career-high WTA rankings of 266 in singles, achieved on 3 October 2022, and 648 in doubles, set on 3 October 2022.

She made her WTA Tour main-draw debut at the 2021 Budapest Grand Prix, where she received a wildcard into the doubles tournament. At the 2022 Budapest Grand Prix, she made her singles Tour level debut after receiving wildcard.

ITF Circuit finals

Singles: 4 (3 titles, 1 runner-up)

Doubles: 4 (2 titles, 2 runner-up)

References

External links
 
 

2003 births
Living people
Hungarian female tennis players
21st-century Hungarian women